Mahasamudram Gnanedra Reddy (born 1 December 1947), also known as MG Reddy, is an Indian politician served as a member of the 9th Lok Sabha of India. He represented the Chittoor constituency of Andhra Pradesh. He was re-elected in the 10th Lok Sabha General Election in 1991 for Chittoor Andhra Pradesh.

References 

 
 

1947 births
Living people
YSR Congress Party politicians